The 1861 California gubernatorial election took place on September 4, 1861. Incumbent Governor John G. Downey was not a candidate for renomination, as his Democratic Party had violently ruptured over the issue of slavery and secession. Downey was a Lecompton Democrat, those who favored slavery in the Kansas Territory and who were running as now as the Breckenridge or "Chivalry" Democrats. These Chivalry Democrats supported Attorney General John McConnell. Anti-slavery or anti-secession Democrats were the "Unionist" Democrats who favored John Conness.

With the dire split in the Democratic Party, even more bitter than in 1859, former Republican nominee Leland Stanford won a plurality of the popular vote and won the governorship. Stanford polled less than a tenth of the vote last election and became the first Republican Governor of California. Both Stanford and Conness later served in the United States Senate.

Results

References

External links
History

California
Gubernatorial
1861
September 1861 events